Edward Pritchett (1807-1876) was a nineteenth-century English painter and man of mystery.

Little is known of Pritchett's life; he has appropriately been described as "elusive." Pritchett spent periods over three decades living and working in Venice, producing admirable views of the city; he was one of a group of English artists who produced notable records of the scenes of northern Italy, a group that included John Wharlton Bunney, James Holland, the brothers-in-law Luke Fildes and Henry Woods, and, in a later generation, William Logsdail.

References

External links
 Pritchett's The Salute, Venice
 The Ducal Palace from the Piazzetta

19th-century English painters
English male painters
Year of birth unknown
Year of death unknown
19th-century English male artists